Gold baton award may refer to:

 Alfred I. duPont-Columbia University Award
 An award bestowed by the League of American Orchestras